Žiar is a village and municipality in Liptovský Mikuláš District in the Žilina Region of northern Slovakia. Ziar (Persian: زيار) also is name of a small town in Isfahan province in Iran with population of above 5000 people.

History
In historical records the village was first mentioned in 1349.

Geography
The municipality lies at an altitude of 765 metres and covers an area of 21.894 km². It has a population of about 417 people.

External links 
http://www.obecziar.szm.sk/
http://www.statistics.sk/mosmis/eng/run.html
http://www.dolinky.szm.sk/
http://www.salasziar.sk/
http://penzionfrank.sk/

Villages and municipalities in Liptovský Mikuláš District